It's a Condition is the first studio album by American new wave band Romeo Void, released in 1981. It was released on CD by Wounded Bird Records, together with Strange Language, Debora Iyall's 1986 solo album, in July 2007, and digitally in 2011. The cover artwork was by Debora Iyall.

Track listing
All songs written by Debora Iyall, Peter Woods, and Frank Zincavage, except where noted.

 "Myself to Myself" – 3:43
 "Nothing for Me" (Iyall, Zincavage) – 3:36
 "Talk Dirty (to Me)" – 4:44
 "Love Is an Illness" – 3:42
 "White Sweater" – 4:47
 "Charred Remains" – 3:03
 "Confrontation" – 2:41
 "Drop Your Eyes" (Iyall, Zincavage) – 3:37
 "Fear to Fear" – 2:38
 "I Mean It" (Benjamin Bossi, Iyall, Woods, Zincavage) – 5:38

Personnel
Debora Iyall – vocals
Peter Woods – guitar
Benjamin Bossi – saxophone
Frank Zincavage – bass
John Haines – drums, percussion

Chart positions
Single

References

Romeo Void albums
1981 debut albums
Albums produced by David Kahne
415 Records albums